Vasili Aleksandrovich Kuznetsov (born 24 August 1978) is a Russian professional football coach and a former goalkeeper. He is the goalkeeper coach with Spartak Moscow.

Honours
 Belarusian Premier League runner-up: 2007.
 Belarusian Premier League bronze: 2005.

External links
 

1978 births
Living people
Footballers from Moscow
Russian footballers
Association football goalkeepers
PFC CSKA Moscow players
FC Sibir Novosibirsk players
FC Partizan Minsk players
FC Gomel players
FC Neman Grodno players
Armenian Premier League players
Belarusian Premier League players
Russian expatriate footballers
Expatriate footballers in Armenia
Expatriate footballers in Belarus